Abyssinia Creek is a small meander in The Pilbara, Western Australia. It flows through the Tambourah mining district from the Tambourah Creek.

References
 Abyssinia Creek in the Gazetteer of Australia
Watercourses of Western Australia